A. M. Dassu is an English writer of fiction and non-fiction. In 2017, Dassu won the international We Need Diverse Books mentorship award. Her bestselling debut novel, was published  in October 2020, and was shortlisted for the 2021 Waterstone's Children's Books Prize.

Life 
She was born and raised in England and has a mixed heritage originally from Iraq's Baghdad, India, Burma and Pakistan – her father was born in Tanzania.

In January 2021 she became one of The National Literacy Trust‘s Connecting Stories campaign's leading authors, aiming to help inspire a love of reading and writing in children and young people. Boy, Everywhere received a Kirkus Star in February 2021.  Dassu's writing has been published by The Huffington Post, Times Educational Supplement, SCOOP Magazine, Lee & Low Books, and DK Books.

Dassu campaigns in support of refugees; she used the advance payments for Boy, Everywhere to help Syrian refugees in the UK. She also set up a We Need Diverse Books grant for supporting an unpublished refugee or immigrant writer. Dassu is patron of The Other Side Of Hope: Journeys in Refugee and Immigrant Literature, a literary magazine edited by immigrants and refugees which aims to celebrate refugee and immigrant communities around the world.

In addition to her work as a writer and campaigner, Dassu is also the deputy editor of SCBWI-BI's Words & Pictures magazine and a director at Inclusive Minds – a CIC that works towards greater inclusion, accessibility and more authentic representation of marginalised groups in books for young people.

Bibliography

References 

Living people
21st-century British writers
21st-century British women writers
British children's writers
British women children's writers
Year of birth missing (living people)